The Mendham Borough Schools are a community public school district that serves students in pre-kindergarten through eighth grade from Mendham Borough, in Morris County, New Jersey, United States.

As of the 2020–21 school year, the district, comprised of two schools, had an enrollment of 485 students and 53.4 classroom teachers (on an FTE basis), for a student–teacher ratio of 9.1:1.

Students in public school for ninth through twelfth grades attend West Morris Mendham High School, which is located in Mendham Borough and serves students from Chester Borough, Chester Township, Mendham Borough and Mendham Township. The school is part of the West Morris Regional High School District, which also serves students from Washington Township at West Morris Mendham High School. As of the 2020–21 school year, the high school had an enrollment of 1,142 students and 91.9 classroom teachers (on an FTE basis), for a student–teacher ratio of 12.4:1.

The district is classified by the New Jersey Department of Education as being in District Factor Group "J", the highest of eight groupings. District Factor Groups organize districts statewide to allow comparison by common socioeconomic characteristics of the local districts. From lowest socioeconomic status to highest, the categories are A, B, CD, DE, FG, GH, I and J.

History
Mendham Borough Schools made news in February 2014 when former superintendent Janie Edmonds received a $124,593 annual pension after having served in her role for 7 1/2 years, making her among the highest-paid retired public employees in New Jersey.

Schools
Schools in the district (with 2020–21 enrollment data from the National Center for Education Statistics) are:
Elementary school
Hilltop Elementary School with 241 students in grades PreK-4 
David Heller, Principal
Middle school
Mountain View Middle School with 241 students in grades 5-8
Aimee Toth, Principal

Administration
Core members of the district's administration are:
Dr. Mitzi N. Morillo, Superintendent
Felicia Kicinski, Business Administrator / Board Secretary

Board of education
The district's board of education is comprised of nine members who set policy and oversee the fiscal and educational operation of the district through its administration. As a Type II school district, the board's trustees are elected directly by voters to serve three-year terms of office on a staggered basis, with three seats up for election each year held (since 2012) as part of the November general election. The board appoints a superintendent to oversee the district's day-to-day operations and a business administrator to supervise the business functions of the district.

References

External links
Mendham Borough Schools

Mendham Borough Schools, National Center for Education Statistics
West Morris Mendham High School
West Morris Regional High School District

Mendham Borough, New Jersey
New Jersey District Factor Group J
School districts in Morris County, New Jersey